The Endochytriaceae are a family of fungi in the order Cladochytridiales. The family contains 10 genera and 56 species according to a 2008 estimate. It was circumscribed by mycologist Donald J.S. Barr in 1980.

References

External links

Chytridiomycota
Fungus families